Shinden Fudo-ryū (Immovable Heart School) was a school of Japanese martial arts.

Founded in around 1130CE by Ganpachiro Temeyoshi, Shinden Fudo is one of the oldest styles of Jujutsu. It focuses on working with one's natural surroundings, and as such most training takes place outside using natural objects as training aids. The school puts emphasis on fighting from any posture one finds themselves in at the time a fight begins, rather than needing to prepare by getting into a stance first. This allows the practitioner to remain receptive to sudden attacks. As an extension of this principle, the school has no formal stance (kamae); all techniques start from a natural, loose, standing posture. The curriculum is entirely unarmed; there are no weapons used in this system.

The school is of Chinese origin, based on techniques brought to Japan by Buddhist refugees. It was one of the styles studied by Edward William Barton-Wright, the founder of Bartitsu, and one of the first Westerners to practice Japanese martial arts.

References

Japanese martial arts
Ko-ryū bujutsu
Jujutsu